Pittsville is a town in Wicomico County, Maryland, United States. The population was 1,417 at the 2010 census. It is included in the Salisbury, Maryland-Delaware Metropolitan Statistical Area.

Geography

Pittsville played the part of the backwater Iowa town in the 1974 made-for-TV movie The Rimers of Eldritch starring Rue McClanahan and Susan Sarandon.

Demographics

2010 census
As of the census of 2010, there were 1,417 people, 591 households, and 382 families living in the town. The racial makeup of the town was 90.3% White, 4.8% African American, 0.1% Native American, 1.6% Asian, 0.6% from other races, and 2.6% from two or more races. Hispanic or Latino of any race were 1.9% of the population.

There were 591 households, of which 33.5% had children under the age of 18 living with them, 45.3% were married couples living together, 14.6% had a female householder with no husband present, 4.7% had a male householder with no wife present, and 35.4% were non-families. 28.3% of all households were made up of individuals, and 9.7% had someone living alone who was 65 years of age or older. The average household size was 2.40 and the average family size was 2.93.

The median age in the town was 39.1 years. 23.4% of residents were under the age of 18; 7.8% were between the ages of 18 and 24; 27.4% were from 25 to 44; 28.9% were from 45 to 64; and 12.6% were 65 years of age or older. The gender makeup of the town was 47.6% male and 52.4% female.

2000 census
As of the census of 2000, there were 1,182 people, 477 households, and 321 families living in the town. The racial makeup of the town was 87.56% White, 6.60% African American, 0.17% Native American, 3.89% Asian, 0.08% from other races, and 1.69% from two or more races. Hispanic or Latino of any race were 1.61% of the population.

There were 477 households, out of which 36.7% had children under the age of 18 living with them, 45.7% were married couples living together, 16.1% had a female householder with no husband present, and 32.5% were non-families. 26.6% of all households were made up of individuals, and 8.2% had someone living alone who was 65 years of age or older. The average household size was 2.48 and the average family size was 2.93.

In the town, the population was spread out, with 26.8% under the age of 18, 9.6% from 18 to 24, 34.1% from 25 to 44, 20.5% from 45 to 64, and 9.0% who were 65 years of age or older. The median age was 32 years. For every 100 females, there were 88.5 males. For every 100 females age 18 and over, there were 84.0 males.

The median income for a household in the town was $32,500, and the median income for a family was $39,375. Males had a median income of $31,141 versus $20,759 for females. The per capita income for the town was $15,966. About 8.3% of families and 9.3% of the population were below the poverty line, including 9.7% of those under age 18 and 8.2% of those age 65 or over.

References

Towns in Maryland
Towns in Wicomico County, Maryland
Salisbury metropolitan area